Ouagadougou is the capital of Burkina Faso and the administrative, communications, cultural, and economic centre of the nation. It is also the country's largest city, with a population of 2,415,266 in 2019. The city's name is often shortened to Ouaga. The inhabitants are called ouagalais. The spelling of the name Ouagadougou is derived from the French orthography common in former French African colonies.

Ouagadougou's primary industries are food processing and textiles. It is served by an international airport and is linked by rail to Abidjan in the Ivory Coast and, for freight only, to Kaya. There are several highways linking the city to Niamey, Niger, south to Ghana, and southwest to Ivory Coast. Ouagadougou has one of West Africa's largest markets, which burned down in 2003 and has since reopened with better facilities and improved fire-prevention measures. Other attractions include the National Museum of Burkina Faso, the Moro-Naba Palace (site of the Moro-Naba Ceremony), the National Museum of Music, and several craft markets.

History

Ouagadougou was founded in the 11th century and it was originally called Kumbee-Tenga which means "the land of princes". The name Ouagadougou dates back to the 15th century when the Ninsi tribes inhabited the area. They were in constant conflict until 1441 when Wubri, a Yonyonse hero and an important figure in Burkina Faso's history, led his tribe to victory. He then renamed the area from "Kumbee-Tenga", as the Ninsi had called it, to "Wage sabre soba koumbem tenga", meaning "head war chief's village". Ouagadougou is a Francophone spelling of the name.

The city became the capital of the Mossi Empire in 1441 and became the permanent residence of the Mossi emperors (Moro-Naba) in 1681. The Moro-Naba Ceremony is still performed every Friday by the Moro-Naba and his court. In 1919 the French made Ouagadougou the capital of the Upper Volta territory (basically the same area as contemporary Burkina Faso). In 1954 the railroad line from Ivory Coast reached the city. Ouagadougou's population doubled from 1954 to 1960 and has been doubling about every ten years since.

On 15 January 2016, gunmen armed with heavy weapons attacked central Ouagadougou at the Cappuccino restaurant and the Splendid Hotel. 28 people were killed, and at least 56 wounded; after a government counterattack, a total of 176 hostages were released the morning after the initial attack. Three of the perpetrators were also killed. The jihadist insurgency continued with major attacks in 2017 and 2018.

Geography

Ouagadougou, situated on the central plateau, grew around the imperial palace of the Mogho Naaba. An administrative centre of colonial rule, it became an important urban centre in the post-colonial era. First the capital of the Mossi Kingdoms and later of Upper Volta and Burkina Faso, Ouagadougou became a veritable communal centre in 1995.

Climate

Ouagadougou's climate is hot semi-arid (BSh) under Köppen-Geiger classification, and closely borders with tropical wet and dry (Aw). The maximum temperature during the hot season, which runs from March to April, can reach . The harmattan (a dry wind) and the West African Monsoon are the two main factors that determine Ouagadougou's climate. Even though Ouagadougou is farther from the equator, its hottest months' temperatures are slightly hotter than those of Bobo-Dioulasso, the country's second most populous city.

Government

Ouagadougou's first municipal elections were held in 1956. The city is governed by a mayor who is elected to a five-year term, two senior councillors, and 90 councillors.

The city is divided into five arrondissements, consisting of 30 sectors, which are subdivided into districts. Districts of Ouagadougou include Gounghin, Kamsaoghin, Koulouba, Moemmin, Niogsin, Paspanga, Peuloghin, Bilbalogho, and Tiendpalogo.

The population of this area is estimated at 1,475,000, 48% of whom are men and 52% women. The rural population is about 5% and the urban population about 95% of the total, and the density is 6,727 inhabitants per square kilometre, according to the 2006 census.

Ouagadougou's communes have invested in huge city-management projects. This is largely because Ouagadougou constitutes a 'cultural centre' by merit of holding the SIAO (International Arts and Crafts fair) and the FESPACO (Panafrican Film and Television Festival of Ouagadougou). Moreover, the villages' growing affluence allows for such investment, and the population's rapid growth necessitates it.

Education
Though literacy in Ouagadougou is not high, there are three universities in the city. The largest is the state University of Ouagadougou, which was founded in 1974. In 2010 it had around 40,000 students (83% of the national population of university students).

The city's official language is French and the principal local languages are More, Dyula and Fulfulde. The bilingual program in schools (French plus one of the local languages) was established in 1994.

International schools include:
 Lycée Saint-Exupéry de Ouagadougou (French school)
 International School of Ouagadougou

Sport

Ouagadougou's inhabitants play a wide array of sports, including association football, basketball, and volleyball. There are tournaments and activities organized by the local authorities. The Stade du 4-Août is the home of Étoile Filante de Ouagadougou, the city's main Football team.

Health
Ouagadougou has both state and private hospitals. The two state hospitals in the city are the Centre hospitalier national Yalgado Ouedraogo (CHNYO) and the Centre hospitalier national pédiatrique Charles de Gaulle (CHNP-CDG). Despite that, the local population still largely can only afford traditional local medicine and the "pharmacopée".

Transport

Many residents travel on motorcycles and mopeds. The large private vendor of motorcycles JC Megamonde sells 50,000 motorbikes and mopeds every year.

Ouagadougou's citizens also travel in green cabs, which take their passengers anywhere in town for 200 to 400 CFA, but the price is higher after 10:00 pm and can then reach 1000 CFA.

Air transport
Thomas Sankara International Airport Ouagadougou (code OUA) serves the area with flights to West Africa and Europe. Air Burkina has its head office in the Air Burkina Storey Building in Ouagadougou.

Rail

Ouagadougou is connected by passenger rail service to Bobo-Dioulasso, Koudougou and Ivory Coast. As of June 2014, Sitarail operates a passenger train three times a week along the route from Ouagadougou to Abidjan. There are freight services to Kaya in the north of Burkina Faso and in 2014 plans were announced to revive freight services to the Manganese mine at Tambao starting in 2016.

Economy 

The economy of Ouagadougou is based on industry and commerce. Some industrial facilities have relocated from Bobo-Dioulasso to Ouagadougou, which has made the city an important industrial centre of Burkina Faso. The industrial areas of Kossodo and Gounghin are home to several processing plants and factories. The industry of Ouagadougou is sector that fuels urban growth, as people move to the city from the countryside to find employment in industry. The Copromof workshop in Ouagadougou sews cotton lingerie for the French label "Atelier Augusti."

Ouagadougou is an important commercial centre. It is a centre where goods are collected and directed to rural areas. With a large consumer base, large amounts of energy sources, raw materials for buildings, agricultural products and livestock products are imported to the city.

The economy is dominated by the informal sector, which is characterized by petty commodity production, and workers not necessarily having salaries. Traditional, informal trade is widespread and concentrated around markets and major roads, as well as in outlets in neighborhoods. There are also instances of modern economic practices with workplaces having qualified, stable labor forces, or more traditional forms of business such as family businesses.

The tertiary sector is also an important part of the economy. This comprises communications, banking, transport, bars, restaurants, hotels, as well as administrative jobs.

Twin towns – sister cities

Ouagadougou is twinned with:

Bordeaux, France
Briton Ferry, Wales, United Kingdom
Grenoble, France
Kumasi, Ghana
Kuwait City, Kuwait
Leuze-en-Hainaut, Belgium
Lyon, France
Taipei, Taiwan
Zhengzhou, China

Parks
The Bangr-Weoogo urban park, before colonialism, belonged to the Mosse chiefs. Considering it a sacred forest, many went there for traditional initiations or for refuge. The French colonists, disregarding its local significance and history, established it as a park in the 1930s. In 1985, renovations were done in the park. In January 2001, the park was renamed "Parc Urbain Bangr-Weoogo", meaning "the urban park of the forest of knowledge".

Another notable park in Ouagadougou is the "L'Unité Pédagogique", which shelters animals in a semi-free state.

"Jardin de l'amitié Ouaga-Loudun" (Garden of Ouaga-Loudun Friendship), with a green space that was renovated in 1996, is a symbol of the twin-city relationship between Ouagadougou and Loudun in France. It is situated in the centre of the city, near the "Nation Unies' crossroads".

Culture 

There are a number of cultural and art venues, such as the Maison du Peuple and Salle des Banquets, in addition to performances of many genres of music, including traditional folk music, modern music, and rap.

 National Museum of Music: exhibits all the musical instruments of Burkina Faso.
 Musée de Manega: also exhibits musical instruments of Burkina Faso, Mossi rifles and other cultural items.
 "Naba Koom": a statue depicting a woman handling a calabash to pour water. The place bears the name of an important chief in Burkina Faso's history.
The exhibit displays works of art from five continents.
 "La Place du Grand Lyon": a monument that reflects the relationship between Burkina Faso's capital and Lyon in France. It is located near the French cultural centre George Melies and features an imposing lion.

Art and crafts
Several international festivals and activities are organized within the municipality, such as FESPACO (Panafrican Film and Television Festival of Ouagadougou), which is Africa's largest festival of this type, SIAO (International Art and Craft Fair), FESPAM (Pan-African Music Festival), FITMO (International Theatre and Marionnette Festival) and FESTIVO.

Places of worship    

The most common places of worship are Muslim mosques. There are also numerous Christian churches: Roman Catholic Archdiocese of Ouagadougou (Catholic Church), Association of Reformed Evangelical Church of Burkina Faso (World Communion of Reformed Churches), Assemblies of God, Deeper Life Bible Church, and the International Evangelism Center.

Notable people 
 Malika Ouattara – slam poet and activist

See also
List of cities in Burkina Faso

Notes

References

Bibliography

External links 

 Official website of the government of Ouagadougou 
 The plan of Ouagdougou
 Falling Rain Genomics: World Index, and other pages

 
Capitals in Africa
French West Africa
Populated places in the Centre Region (Burkina Faso)
Populated places established in the 11th century